The Taiwan New Cultural Movement Memorial Hall is a memorial hall in Dadaocheng, Datong District, Taipei, Taiwan.

History
The memorial hall building was originally constructed in 1933 during the Japanese rule of Taiwan as the police headquarters of Taihoku Prefecture. The memorial hall was established on 1 January 2016.

Exhibitions
The memorial hall exhibits the history of New Cultural Movement and culture of Dadaocheng. The ground floor of the building houses the permanent exhibition and the upper floor houses the special exhibition.

Transportation
The memorial hall is accessible within walking distance south of Daqiaotou Station of Taipei Metro.

See also
 List of tourist attractions in Taiwan

References

External links

  

2016 establishments in Taiwan
Buildings and structures in Taipei
Former police stations in Taiwan
Monuments and memorials in Taiwan